The Soul Sessions Vol. 2 is the sixth studio album by English singer and songwriter Joss Stone, released on 20 July 2012 by S-Curve Records and her own label, Stone'd Records. A follow-up to Stone's debut studio album, The Soul Sessions (2003), the album consists of 11 cover versions of soul songs from the 1960s, 1970s and 1980s, in addition to a cover of Broken Bells' 2009 song "The High Road".

Upon its release, the album received mostly mixed reviews from music critics. The Soul Sessions Vol. 2 debuted at number six on the UK Albums Chart, while charting within the top 10 in the United States and select countries in continental Europe.

Background
The Soul Sessions Vol. 2 was recorded over two live recording sessions in New York City and Nashville. The album is a joint release between Stone's own independent label Stone'd Records and S-Curve Records, the label that released her first two studio albums, The Soul Sessions (2003) and Mind Body & Soul (2004). Stone stated, "I really had fun revisiting The Soul Sessions idea and I'm really pleased with the results. I've committed long term to my label Stone'd Records, but it felt right to team up with Steve Greenberg and S-Curve again for this release. I think there are some great songs on the album and I loved performing them with such brilliant musicians."

Promotion
On 6 June 2012, Stone performed a concert at the London music venue Under the Bridge, which was streamed online via Perez Hilton's website in the United States and MSN for the rest of the world. During the concert Stone, performed several new tracks from the album as well as previous material. Stone also performed for Billboards Tastemakers series in June 2012. Stone performed and was interviewed on the British television programme This Morning. On 27 July 2012, she performed on The Tonight Show with Jay Leno.

Reception

The Soul Sessions Vol. 2 received generally mixed reviews from music critics. At Metacritic, which assigns a normalised rating out of 100 to reviews from mainstream publications, the album received an average score of 60, based on 11 reviews. Mojo magazine said it "sounds like a calculated genre exercise", while Kyle Anderson of Entertainment Weekly found the covers "passionately pointless" when compared to the originals. Slant Magazines Jonathan Keefe said the album sounds commonplace because of its attempt to recreate "a vintage R&B vibe rather than looking to classic styles as a source of inspiration for something more contemporary or creative". Hermione Hoby of The Observer wrote that Stone's singing is "technically irreproachable throughout, [but] every track is attacked with all the timidity of a tsunami—enough to prompt the peevish complaint that force and feeling are not the same thing." Jody Rosen, writing in Rolling Stone, was more critical and felt Stone's "musical instincts are off [...] she steamrolls nearly every song with her bombastic blues growl."

In a more enthusiastic review for AllMusic, critic Stephen Thomas Erlewine believed "for the most part, The Soul Sessions, Vol. 2 does feel right: it has the form and sound of classic soul while never acknowledging that R&B continued to develop past, say, 1972. For an audience that agrees with that thesis, this is fun." The Guardians Dave Simpson described the album as "a powerful, heartfelt and classy comeback", claiming that Stone has "certainly returned to her debut's soul covers format in more mature and superb voice." Hal Horowitz of American Songwriter called the album "pretty terrific" as it "proves the UK singer is serious about her classic American R&B". John Aizlewood of BBC Music viewed The Soul Sessions Vol. 2 as "Stone's most focused and rewarding album since Vol 1".

Commercial performance
The Soul Sessions Vol. 2 debuted at number six on the UK Albums Chart with 8,414 copies sold in its first week, Stone's first top-10 album in the United Kingdom since Mind Body & Soul (2004). In the United States, the album debuted at number 10 on the Billboard 200 with first-week sales of 24,000 copies, becoming her fourth top-10 album on the chart. In continental Europe, it reached the top five in the Netherlands and Switzerland, and the top 10 in Austria and Germany.

Track listing

Personnel
Credits adapted from the liner notes of the deluxe edition of The Soul Sessions Vol. 2.

Musicians

 Joss Stone – vocals ; finger snaps ; lead vocals, background vocals ; handclaps, glockenspiel 
 Raymond Angry – B3 ; clavinet ; Wurlitzer electric piano ; piano 
 Clayton Ivey – Wurlitzer electric piano ; piano ; B3 ; Rhodes 
 Ernie Isley – guitar 
 Pete Iannacone – bass 
 Tony Royster Jr. – drums 
 Eric Darken – finger snaps ; percussion ; tambourine ; handclaps 
 FILMharmonic Orchestra – strings 
 Marko Ivanović – conducting 
 Rita Chepurchenko – concert mistress 
 Nathan Kelly – string arrangement ; copyist, co-orchestration 
 John Angier – string arrangement 
 Petr Pycha – Prague orchestra contractor 
 Gary Chester – US orchestra coordination 
 William McFarlane – guitar 
 Delbert McClinton – harmonica 
 Latimore – piano ; 1-2-3-4-5-6-7 
 James Alexander – bass 
 Hollie Farris – trumpet 
 Jeff Watkins – saxophones 
 Chris Dunn – trombone 
 Betty Wright – background vocals 
 Steve Bryant – guitar

Technical

 Pavel Karlík – string engineering 
 Steve Greenwell – production, engineering, mixing
 Joss Stone – production, executive production
 Steve Greenberg – production, executive production
 Brian Nelson – executive production, project coordination
 Lowell Reynolds – engineering assistance
 Ted Tuthill – engineering assistance
 Janeen Hovnanian – production assistance
 Jill Dell'Abate – project coordination
 Chris Gehringer – mastering

Artwork
 Mr.G.e.v.Zoeller – original painting
 Rod Cousins – art direction
 David Venni – photography
 Charles Allen Smith – additional photography
 Daniel Slezinger – additional photography

Charts

Weekly charts

Year-end charts

Release history

References

2012 albums
Covers albums
Joss Stone albums
S-Curve Records albums
Sequel albums
Warner Records albums